The American Institute of Bisexuality (AIB) is a charity founded on July 23, 1998, by sex researcher, psychiatrist and bisexual rights activist Fritz Klein to promote research and education about bisexuality.

AIB produces the Journal of Bisexuality, a quarterly academic journal focusing on issues relating to bisexuality. In addition, it runs bi.org, an education and outreach site for the general public, which provides accessible, science-based information on (bi)sexuality and helps create bi visibility by highlighting the lives of both famous and everyday bi people.

AIB maintains a division known as the Bi Foundation that conducts outreach, community building, and education across the globe. The Institute is a Delaware non-profit corporation qualified for tax purposes as a private foundation under Section 501(c)(3) of the U.S. Internal Revenue Code.

AIB offers grants toward research and programming related to bisexuality.

BiReConUSA 

In June 2013, the American Institute of Bisexuality and the Bisexual Organizing Project funded the first BiReConUSA, modeled on BiReCon (UK). It was co-chaired by Dr. Lauren Beach and Alex Iantaffi.

See also
 Bisexual community
 Klein Sexual Orientation Grid

References

External links
 American Institute of Bisexuality — official website
 Bi.org — the public outreach site of the AIB
 The Journal of Bisexuality — the academic journal of the AIB

Bisexual culture in the United States
Bisexual organizations
LGBT organizations in the United States
Health charities in the United States
1998 establishments in the United States
Charities based in Delaware
Medical and health organizations based in Delaware